The 2004 GFS Marketplace 400 was the 23rd stock car race of the 2004 NASCAR Nextel Cup Series season and the 35th iteration of the event. The race was held on Sunday, August 22, 2004, before a crowd of 160,000 in Brooklyn, Michigan at Michigan International Speedway, a two-mile (3.2 km) permanent moderate-banked D-shaped speedway. The race took the scheduled 200 laps to complete. At race's end, Greg Biffle of Roush Racing would run away with the race, passing teammate Mark Martin to win his second career NASCAR Nextel Cup Series win and his first of the season. To fill out the podium, Dale Jarrett of Robert Yates Racing would finish third.

Background 

The race was held at Michigan International Speedway, a two-mile (3.2 km) moderate-banked D-shaped speedway located in Brooklyn, Michigan. The track is used primarily for NASCAR events. It is known as a "sister track" to Texas World Speedway as MIS's oval design was a direct basis of TWS, with moderate modifications to the banking in the corners, and was used as the basis of Auto Club Speedway. The track is owned by International Speedway Corporation. Michigan International Speedway is recognized as one of motorsports' premier facilities because of its wide racing surface and high banking (by open-wheel standards; the 18-degree banking is modest by stock car standards).

Entry list 

*Withdrew.

Practice

First practice 
The first practice session was originally scheduled to be held on Friday, August 20, at 11:00 AM EST, and would have lasted for an hour and 50 minutes. However, rain would delay the session for over an hour, and afterwards, only 48 minutes of the session were ran.

Second practice 
The second practice session would occur on Saturday, August 21, at 9:30 AM EST and would last for 45 minutes.

Third and final practice 
The third and final practice session, sometimes referred to as Happy Hour, would occur on Saturday, August 21, at 11:10 AM EST and would last for 45 minutes.

Starting lineup 
Qualifying was originally scheduled to occur on Friday, August 20, at 3:10 PM EST. However, rain on Friday would cancel qualifying, making the lineup based on the current 2004 owner's points. As a result, Jimmie Johnson of Hendrick Motorsports would win the pole.

Nine drivers would fail to qualify: Kevin Lepage, Stanton Barrett, Kerry Earnhardt, Kyle Busch, Kenny Wallace, Larry Hollenbeck, J. J. Yeley, Mike Wallace, and Stan Boyd.

Full qualifying results

Race results

References 

2004 NASCAR Nextel Cup Series
NASCAR races at Michigan International Speedway
August 2004 sports events in the United States
2004 in sports in Michigan